The Haden Triplets, Petra, Tanya, and Rachel (born October 11, 1971 in New York City), are musicians who have performed individually in bands and together. They are the daughters of jazz double-bassist Charlie Haden.

The triplets, separately and together, have contributed to recordings and performances by the Foo Fighters, Queens of the Stone Age, Weezer, Beck, Green Day, Todd Rundgren, the Rentals, and Silversun Pickups. Petra and Rachel are former members of That Dog. The three had previously performed together live and as The Fates on Anaïs Mitchell's Hadestown.

In 2014, they released their first vocal album together, The Haden Triplets produced by Ry Cooder on Jack White's Third Man Records and it collects stripped-down, old-time country songs from the Carter Family, Bill Monroe, the Stanley Brothers, Webb Pierce, Kitty Wells, and the Louvin Brothers.  On January 13, 2015 they performed together at Charlie Haden's Memorial Concert in New York City's Town Hall.

In 2020, they released a follow-up album, The Family Songbook.

Discography

Albums

References

External links 
 

Sibling musical trios
Triplets
Third Man Records artists